The Tanggu Truce, sometimes called the , was a ceasefire that was signed between the Republic of China and the Empire of Japan in Tanggu District, Tianjin, on May 31, 1933. It formally ended the Japanese invasion of Manchuria, which had begun in 1931.

Background
After the Mukden Incident of September 18, 1931, the Japanese Kwantung Army invaded Manchuria and, by February 1932, it had captured the entire region. The last emperor of the Qing dynasty, Puyi, who was living in exile in the Foreign Concessions in Tianjin, was convinced by the Japanese to accept the throne of the new Empire of Manchukuo, which remained under the control of the Imperial Japanese Army.

In January 1933, to secure Manchukuo's southern borders, a joint Japanese and Manchukuo force invaded Rehe. After conquering that province by March, it drove the remaining Chinese armies in the northeast beyond the Great Wall into Hebei Province.

From the start of hostilities, China had appealed to its neighbors and the international community but received no effective support. When China called an emergency meeting of the League of Nations, a committee was established to investigate the affair. The Lytton Commission's report ultimately condemned Japan's actions but offered no plan for intervention. In response, the Japanese simply withdrew from the League on March 27, 1933.

The Japanese army was under explicit instructions from Japanese Emperor Hirohito, who wanted a quick end to the China conflict and for Japan not to venture beyond the Great Wall. Japan's negotiating position was very strong, as the Chinese Nationalists were under severe pressure from the simultaneous full-scale civil war against the Chinese communists.

Negotiations
On May 22, 1933, Chinese and Japanese representatives met to negotiate the end of the conflict. The Japanese demands were severe: a demilitarized zone extending 100 km south of the Great Wall from Beijing to Tianjin was to be created, with the Great Wall itself under Japanese control. No regular Kuomintang military units were to be allowed in the demilitarized zone, but the Japanese were allowed to use reconnaissance aircraft or ground patrols to ensure that the agreement was maintained. Public order within the zone was to be maintained by a lightly armed Demilitarized Zone Peace Preservation Corps.

Two secret clauses excluded any of the Anti-Japanese Volunteer Armies from the Peace Preservation Corps and provided for any disputes that could not be resolved by the Peace Preservation Corps to be settled by agreement between the Japanese and the Chinese governments.

Harried by their civil war with the communists and unable to win international support, Chiang Kai-shek and the Chinese government agreed to virtually all of Japan's demands.

Furthermore, most of the new demilitarized zone was within the remaining territory of a discredited Manchurian warlord, Zhang Xueliang.

Aftermath

The Tanggu Truce de facto resulted in the recognition of Manchukuo by the Kuomintang government and its acknowledgement of the loss of Rehe. It provided for a temporary end to the combat between China and Japan, and relations between both countries briefly improved. On May 17, 1935, the Japanese legation in China was raised to the status of embassy, and on June 10, 1935, the He-Umezu Agreement was concluded. The Tanggu Truce gave Chiang Kai-shek time to consolidate his forces and to concentrate his efforts against the Chinese Communist Party albeit at the expense of North China.

However, Chinese public opinion was hostile to terms that were so favorable to Japan and so humiliating to China. Although the truce provided for a demilitarized buffer zone, Japanese territorial ambitions towards China remained, and the truce proved to be only a temporary respite until hostilities erupted again in 1937 by the Second Sino-Japanese War.

See also 
 Japanese imperialism
 Unequal treaties

Citations

General sources

External links
 "JAPAN-CHINA: Breathing Spell"—Time magazine, June 12, 1933

1933 in China
1933 in Japan
History of Manchuria
Interwar-period treaties
Peace treaties of China
Peace treaties of Japan
Second Sino-Japanese War
Treaties concluded in 1933
Treaties entered into force in 1933
Treaties of the Empire of Japan
Treaties of the Republic of China (1912–1949)
Unequal treaties